Wataha is a Polish crime series airing on HBO Poland from 12 October 2014.

Cast
 Leszek Lichota as Wiktor Rebrow
 Aleksandra Popławska as  Iga Dobosz
 Andrzej Zieliński as Konrad Markowski
 Bartłomiej Topa as Adam "Grzywa" Grzywaczewski
 Magdalena Popławska as Natalia Tatarkiewicz
 Dagmara Bąk as Aga Małek
 Jarosław Boberek as Wojciech Świtalski
 Maciej Mikołajczyk as Piotr "Rambo" Wójcik
 Jacek Lenartowicz as Michał Łuczak
 Mariusz Saniternik as Kalita
 Jacek Beler as Cinek
 Julia Pogrebińska as Ewa Wityńska
 Jacek Koman as Robert Korda
 Piotr Dąbrowski as Rebrow
 Grzegorz Damięcki as Krzysztof Halman
 Anita Jancia as Marta Siwa
 Anna Donchenko as Alsu Karimowa
 Żora Liścienko as Halid
 Piotr Żurawski as Sylwester Wiśniak
 Borys Połunin as Cień
 Marek Kalita as Igi Dobosz
 Weronika Humaj as Joanna Zięba
 Piotr Chlewicki as Aziukiewicz
 Michał Kaleta as Igi Dobosz
 Matylda Damięcka as Boczarska's guardian
 Karol Bernacki as the guardian of "Sema"
 Filip Gurłacz as Marcin Gauza
 Robert Wabich as Waldek
 Małgorzata Hajewska-Krzysztofik as Krystyna
 Helena Norowicz as Helena
 Artur Janusiak as Tomek
 Dariusz Siastacz as the deputy minister

Episodes

Production
The filming of the first season took place between September and December 2013 in Bieszczady, a mountain range in the Carpathians. The second season was filmed there from October 2016 to February 2017. The show was broadcast in nineteen European countries by HBO Europe alongside other broadcasters.

In June 2016, the British broadcaster Channel 4 aired the first season in English under the title The Border. HBO Europe showed it at the SeriesMania Festval in Paris.

On 17 December 2018, it was announced that the series would receive a third season, scheduled to premiere in 2019. On 13 September it was announced that the premiere would take place on 30 October, however on 26 September it was postponed to 6 December.

References

External links
 
 

2010s Polish television series
Polish-language television shows
Television shows set in Poland
2014 Polish television series debuts
HBO Europe original programming